Patenaude is a surname. Notable people with the surname include:

 Bert Patenaude (1909–1974), American soccer player
 Dave Patenaude (born 1968), American football coach
 Ed Patenaude (born 1949), Canadian professional ice hockey player
 Esioff-Léon Patenaude (1875–1963), Canadian politician
 Martine Patenaude (born 1974), Canadian ice dancer
 Pam Patenaude (born 1961), American government official